The 1948 Bulgarian Cup was the 8th season of the Bulgarian Cup (in this period the tournament was named Cup of the Soviet Army). In the tournament entered the 10 winners of regional cup competitions. Lokomotiv Sofia won the competition for first time, beating Slavia-Chengelov Plovdiv 1–0 in the final at the Yunak Stadium in Sofia.

First round

|}

Quarter-finals

|}

Semi-finals

|}

Final

Details

References

1948
1947–48 domestic association football cups
Cup